"Thank God For You" is a song written by Mac McAnally and Mark Miller, and recorded by American country music group Sawyer Brown. It was released in June 1993 as the lead single from their album, Outskirts of Town. The song reached number-one on the U.S. Billboard Hot Country Songs chart and on the Canadian RPM Country Tracks chart. It also peaked at number 17 on the U.S. Billboard Bubbling Under Hot 100 chart.

Content
In this song the narrator gives thanks for all the things that he has taken for granted in his lifespan:

"I've got to thank mama for the cookin',
Daddy for the whoopin',
The Devil for the trouble that I get into.
I've got to give credit where credit is due,
I thank the bank for the money, thank God for you."

Music video
The music video was directed by Michael Salomon and premiered in June 1993.

Chart positions
"Thank God for You" debuted at number 63 on the U.S. Billboard Hot Country Singles & Tracks for the week of July 3, 1993.

Year-end charts

References

1993 singles
1993 songs
Sawyer Brown songs
Songs written by Mac McAnally
songs written by Mark Miller (musician)
Music videos directed by Michael Salomon
Curb Records singles